Abutilon julianae is a small shrub of the genus Abutilon believed endemic to Norfolk Island and nearby Phillip Island.

History
It was first recorded on Norfolk Island in 1792 by convict artist John Doody, and on Phillip Island by Ferdinand Bauer in 1804-05 where he collected the type specimen.  It appears not to have been recorded on Phillip Island after 1804-05 and on Norfolk Island was last seen about 1912.  For more than seventy years it was considered extinct, apparently killed out by grazing stock.

In the mid-1980s control of feral rabbits on nearby Phillip Island allowed plant seedlings to survive in accessible areas for the first time in more than one hundred years, and in 1985 some seedlings of Abutilon julianae were discovered.  This was one of the first unexpected bonus benefits of rabbit control (and subsequent eradication).  Plants must have survived in the few cliff-bound places inaccessible to both rabbits and people to provide the source of seed for the newly discovered plants.  The species is now widely grown on Norfolk Island and natural regeneration on Phillip Island is growing well, though still very rare.  As the only natural population (with fewer than 50 plants known in 2003) is on Phillip Island it is endemic to that island although it has been propagated and widely planted on Norfolk Island.  It is listed as Critically Endangered under Australia's Environment Protection and Biodiversity Conservation Act.

References

julianae
Flora of Norfolk Island
Critically endangered flora of Australia
Malvales of Australia
Plants described in 1833